"Money Maker" is a song written and performed by American rapper Ludacris featuring fellow American rapper and singer Pharrell Williams.
The song was released to the radio on July 17, 2006 as the first single from Ludacris's fifth album Release Therapy. Produced by Williams and Chad Hugo (known collectively as The Neptunes), the song is a reimagining of the 1961 Elmore James blues song "Shake Your Moneymaker". The single became Ludacris' third number-one song on the US Billboard Hot 100, while also topping the Hot R&B/Hip-Hop Songs and Hot Rap Tracks charts. It also became the number-one single on radio in the United States on October 19, 2006.

Released on August 17, 2006, the song's music video premiered on MTV's Making the Video and later managed to reach the number-one spot on BET's 106 & Park, where it remained for several days. The single had a major promotional campaign and huge airplay on radio around the U.S., Canada and other countries around the globe, while the video received strong airplay on BET, MTV, and Canada's Muchmusic. The song was performed on the 2006 MTV Video Music Awards and later won Best Rap Song at the 49th Grammy Awards.

American R&B singer, Amerie, recorded an answer back (remix) to the single. The song was included on her first mixtape, Because I Love It Volume 1 (the mixtape that was released to accompany her third studio album Because I Love It). The song however did not appear on the final album. Because I Love It was released to international markets only.

Critical reception
About 

Pitchfork

Commercial performance
"Money Maker" debuted at number 96 on the Billboard Hot 100 the week of August 26, 2006. It moved seventeen spots to number 79 the week of September 2, 2006 and another eighteen spots to number 61 the week after. Two weeks later, it entered the top 40 at number 15 the week of September 23, 2006. It moved thirteen spots to number two the week after with gains in airplay and digital sales, but was kept off the top spot for four weeks by Justin Timberlake's "SexyBack". It reached number one the week of October 28, 2006 and held that spot for two weeks before losing it again to Timberlake with "My Love", remaining on the chart for a total of twenty-five weeks. The song gave Ludacris his second number-one hit as lead artist and third overall, as well as Pharrell's second number-one hit.

The song barely has an appearance count in the Billboard Year-End of two, coming in at number thirty-five in 2006 and number ninety-two in 2007.

It peaked at number one on the Hot R&B/Hip-Hop Songs chart for one week, the Rhythmic chart for five weeks, and the Hot Rap Songs chart for seven weeks. On December 6, 2006, the song was certified Platinum by the Recording Industry Association of America (RIAA) for selling over 1,000,000 copies in the United States.

Music video
Directed by Melina Matsoukas (who directed R&B singer Shareefa's "Need a Boss") and released on August 17, 2006, premiering on various music channels including BET, MTV, and MuchMusic, the video for "Money Maker" consists of Ludacris rapping with girls dancing around him against a basically-colored background of orange, green and black. He has a counting machine that counts how many times he gets a girl to shake her rear end (called "money maker") for him. Pharrell appears during the chorus with girls and stacks of money. There is also a Chrysler ME Four-Twelve and large speakers in the background that vibrate throughout the video, which are actually salad bowls, as Ludacris explains in "Making the Video". Allen Iverson, Shareefa, Bobby Valentino, & Lil Fate make cameo appearances. The video notably features Ludacris debuting a fade haircut on camera, having shed his trademark cornrows to mark a new image.

Credits and personnel
The credits for "Money Maker" are adapted from the liner notes of Release Therapy.
Recording
 Recorded at: Chalice Recording Studios in Los Angeles, California.

Personnel
 Ludacris – vocals, songwriting  
 The Neptunes – producers
 Pharrell Williams – vocals, songwriting
 Prateek dubey – recording
 Phil Tan – mixing
 Josh Houghkirk – additional engineering
  – mastering

Charts and certifications

Weekly charts

Certifications

Year-end charts

See also
List of Billboard Hot 100 number-one singles of 2006
List of number-one R&B singles of 2006 (U.S.)
List of Billboard number-one rap singles of the 2000s
List of Billboard Rhythmic Top 40 number-one songs of the 2000s

References

External links
"Money Maker" Review On About.com

2006 singles
2006 songs
Ludacris songs
Pharrell Williams songs
Def Jam Recordings singles
Billboard Hot 100 number-one singles
Dirty rap songs
Song recordings produced by the Neptunes
Songs written by Ludacris
Songs written by Pharrell Williams